John Nicholas Size (autumn 1866 – 14 April 1953) was a British hotelier and tourism promoter, but is best known for his novels about Norse settlers in the English Lake District.

Background
Born in Liverpool, Lancashire in the last quarter of 1866, Nicholas Size followed his father Henry into railway administration. For many years he was goods manager at Exchange Station in Bradford, Yorkshire, but having developed a fondness for the Lake District, around 1920 he reopened the long-derelict Victoria Hotel, now trading as The Bridge Hotel in Buttermere, Cumberland. Initially he pursued his plan of investing in the hotel in tandem with his railway career, but about 1927 he moved in.

Books
Interested in the heritage of the area, Nicholas joined the Cumberland and Westmorland Antiquarian and Archaeological Society in 1927. Intrigued by the possible connection between Buttermere and the Norse landowner Bueth, mentioned in official documents relating to Cumberland at the time of the Norman conquest in the early 12th century, he produced a booklet, The Epic of Buttermere portraying the secluded valley as a stronghold of resistance to the invaders, and site of a supposed Battle of Rannerdale Knotts. This was so successful that in 1929 he wrote an expanded and illustrated novella version, The Secret Valley. This too was a great success, and in 1930 Frederick Warne, publisher of the Beatrix Potter books produced a new edition.

Encouraged by Sir Hugh Walpole, whose own Lakeland historical novels were very popular at the time, in 1932 Size tackled another local Norse story, the supposed origin of the elegant cross at Gosforth. This had first appeared in the novella The Story of Shelagh, Olaf Cuaran's Daughter, by local historian C.A. Parker, but Size's book Shelagh of Eskdale expanded on what Parker had written, to produce a short novel uniform with the second edition of Secret Valley, again published by Warne. Finally, about a year later, Warne published Ola the Russian, a longer novel in which the setting was broadened to include the whole Norse world, fictionalising the life of Olaf Trygvesson.

Size also wrote a short booklet, The Haunted Moor, which recounted the legendary stories of the various strange features on Ilkley Moor near Bradford. This was only available in the local area (but it contained an advertisement for the Victoria Hotel).

Tourism
In addition to expressing his genuine interest (he also wrote a learned paper on the remains of a Norse mill at Buttermere), the books were a means to promote the business; as a local resident later recalled "He'd do anything to make money." Nicholas had problems with some of the local landowners and farmers, who festooned their boundaries with No Trespassing signs, even on wild sheep-pasture. In addition to arguing with such people (earning for himself the name Old Nick), in the 1930s he bought two pieces of land himself, the first being in the relatively flat area leading down to Crummock Water, which he developed as a 9-hole golf course. This facility was available free to guests at the hotel, which was subsequently promoted as the Victoria Golf Hotel. For the less sports-minded, about 1937 he acquired the pretty piece of woodland along the stream opposite the hotel, and opened it to the public under the title of  The Fairy Glen. Local opposition and the Second World War prevented him from bringing his grandest ideas to fruition: a Bavarian-style beer garden at the hotel, complete with brass band; a fully equipped service station for the growing number of cars visiting the valley; and even a chair-lift to the summit of High Crag, at the south end of the lake. Plagued with illness in his last years, he was cared for by his wife at the Buttermere Hotel, which the couple had acquired some years after the Victoria.

In memoriam
Nicholas Size won one very personal battle against the local authorities. His body does not lie in a graveyard, but in a plot of his own choosing on the fellside above the Fairy Glen, in a hole blasted from the solid rock. His two Lakeland novels, reprinted numerous times by Warnes, continued to be available for years after his death. In 1977 they were reissued together by local bookseller and publisher Michael Moon. That edition sold out, and in 1996 a paperback edition of The Secret Valley was published that also sold out. The Victoria Hotel (rechristened the Bridge Hotel) remains in business in 2019.

Sources
Sheila Richardson, Tales of a Lakeland Valley: Buttermere, Workington, Mill Field Publishing (1995) 
Obituary in the Cumberland News (18 Apr 1953)

References

Works
Cup and Ring Stones. Shipley Times & Express, 25 April 1924
The Epic of Buttermere. Historical picture of the great events in Lakeland during Norman times. Buttermere, Size (1927). First published, National Review, June 1927
The Secret Valley. A picture of the great events which took place in unconquered Lakeland during Norman times. Kendal, Titus Wilson, 1929
The Secret Valley: the Real Romance of Unconquered Lakeland. London, Warne (1930)
The Wareham Witches. London, Warne (1931)
Shelagh of Eskdale, or The Stone of Shame. London, Warne (1932)
Ola the Russian. London, Warne (circa 1933)
The Haunted Moor. Otley, William Walker (1934)
Click Mill at Buttermere. Published in Transactions of the Cumberland and Westmorland Antiquarian and Archaeological Society, second series vol. 36 (1936)

1866 births
1953 deaths
20th-century English novelists
English male novelists
20th-century English male writers